Schizopyga is a genus of ichneumon wasps in the family Ichneumonidae. There are about 10 described species in Schizopyga.

Species
These 10 species belong to the genus Schizopyga:
 Schizopyga anseli Fernandez, 2007 c g
 Schizopyga circulator (Panzer, 1800) c g
 Schizopyga congica (Benoit, 1953) c g
 Schizopyga coxator Constantineanu, 1973 c g
 Schizopyga curvicauda (Seyrig, 1935) c g
 Schizopyga flavifrons Holmgren, 1856 c g
 Schizopyga frigida Cresson, 1870 c g b
 Schizopyga nitida Kasparyan, 1976 c g
 Schizopyga podagrica Gravenhorst, 1829 c g
 Schizopyga varipes Holmgren, 1856 c g
Data sources: i = ITIS, c = Catalogue of Life, g = GBIF, b = Bugguide.net

References

Further reading

External links

 

Pimplinae